Corwin is a feature-length documentary by director Les Guthman on Norman Corwin,  writer, director and producer during the Golden Age of Radio.  Corwin aired on PBS during the 1990s.  Actor Charles Laughton said of Corwin, "There is no actor in Hollywood or on Broadway, who would not drop what he is doing to be in one of Norman Corwin's radio plays."

References

External links

1996 films
American documentary films
Documentary films about writers
Documentary films about mass media people
1990s English-language films
1990s American films